The men's 1500 metre freestyle competition of the 2014 FINA World Swimming Championships (25 m) was held on 7 December.

Records
Prior to the competition, the existing world and championship records were as follows.

The following records were established during the competition:

Results

Final
The final was held at 19:36.

*Raced in slower heats.

References

Men's 1500 metre freestyle